Jalan Kampung Raja, Pagoh (Johor state route J139) is a major road in Johor, Malaysia.

List of interchanges

Roads in Johor